PDC may refer to:

In science and technology

Chemistry, biology and medicine 
 Phosducin, a human protein and gene in the retina
 Pyridinium dichromate (Cornforth reagent), a chromium-based oxidant
 Pyruvate dehydrogenase complex, an enzyme complex
 Plasmacytoid dendritic cell

Computing 
 Peripheral DMA controller
 Personal decompression computer, for scuba divers
 Personal Digital Cellular, a Japanese 2G mobile phone standard
 Primary Domain Controller
 Professional Developers Conference, by Microsoft
 Programme Delivery Control, a teletext standard

Other uses in science and technology 

 Power distribution center, electrical equipment 
 Pulsed DC, type of electric current 
 Pyroclastic density current or pyroclastic flow of a volcano

Politics and government 
 Centrist Democratic Party (Rwanda)
 Christian Democratic People's Party of Switzerland
 Partido Demócrata Cristiano (disambiguation), several parties in Central & South America
 Christian Democratic Party (Brazil) (Partido Democrata Cristão)
 Catalan European Democratic Party
 Portland Development Commission, later Prosper Portland, Oregon, US
 Washington State Public Disclosure Commission, US
 Former Constitutional Democratic Party, Italy
 Parlementair Documentatie Centrum (Parliamentary Documentation Centre), (Netherlands), an institute that documents Dutch parliamentary history

Organizations 
 PDC (gang), later rap group, London, UK
 Pacific Disaster Center, disaster preparedness institute based in Hawaii
 Partisan Defense Committee, a Trotskyist legal defense organization
 Phi Delta Chi, pharmaceutical fraternity at the University of Michigan 
 Philosophy Documentation Center, a publisher
 Producers Distributing Corporation, 1920s US film company
 Professional Darts Corporation, operates darts competitions
 Publications Distribution Cooperative

Other uses
 Pennsylvania Dutch language (ISO 639-3 language code)
 Pocket Dream Console, a game console
 Permaculture Design Certificate course on sustainable systems by Geoff Lawton